Abacetus planidorsis is a species of ground beetle in the subfamily Pterostichinae. It was described by Straneo in 1949.

References

planidorsis
Beetles described in 1949